This list includes all the newspapers and academic journals published by the University of Santo Tomas.

Academic and research journals

Newsletters

University-wide

College-based

References

Publications
Santo Tomas